Super Groover the Box: The Perfect Singles is a box set by Japanese singer Yōko Oginome. Released through Victor Entertainment on December 23, 2009, as part of Oginome's 25th solo career anniversary, the box set compiles all of her singles, B-sides, remixes, and music videos from 1984 to 2005.

The box set peaked at No. 178 on Oricon's albums chart.

Track listing

Charts

References

External links
 
 

2009 compilation albums
Yōko Oginome compilation albums
Japanese-language compilation albums
Victor Entertainment compilation albums